"When You Got Dry/How Much Is Enough" was a double A-Side single only released on 7 inch vinyl in November 1994 by Australian rock band You Am I.  Due to a pressing fault, only 449 copies were ever produced out of what was to be a run of 1000, making this one of the rarest You Am I releases.

Track listing
Side One
 "When You Got Dry " – 3:22
 "Ken (The Mother Nature's Son)" - 2:23
Side Two
 "How Much Is Enough " - 3:41
 "Bitter Young Man Of The Fanzine Press " - 1:54

All songs by Tim Rogers

"Ken (The Mother Nature's Son)" and "How Much is Enough" also appear on Hi Fi Way. "When You Got Dry" was later released as a b-side on the "Tuesday" single. "Bitter Young Man Of The Fanzine Press" was later released on a Ra Records sampler called Rare Cords.

References

1994 singles
You Am I songs
Songs written by Tim Rogers (musician)
1994 songs
Songs written by Andy Kent
Songs written by Rusty Hopkinson